Ampanang is an Austronesian language of Borneo.

References

External links
 Information about the Ampanang people (archived)

Mahakam languages
Languages of Indonesia